Martin Sourzac (born 25 March 1992) is a French professional footballer who plays as a goalkeeper for  club Nancy.

Club career
On 12 July 2022, Sourzac returned to Nancy after one season away.

Honours
Monaco
Ligue 2: 2012–13

References

External links

1992 births
Living people
People from Vendôme
Sportspeople from Loir-et-Cher
Association football goalkeepers
French footballers
AS Monaco FC players
R.W.D.M. Brussels F.C. players
Nîmes Olympique players
AS Nancy Lorraine players
FC Chambly Oise players
Ligue 2 players
Championnat National 2 players
Championnat National 3 players
Challenger Pro League players
French expatriate footballers
French expatriate sportspeople in Belgium
Expatriate footballers in Belgium